George Passant is the first published of C. P. Snow's series of novels Strangers and Brothers, but the second according to the internal chronology. It was first published under the name Strangers and Brothers. It was published in the U.S. in 1960.

Plot synopsis
George Passant is a solicitor in a small English town, whose idealism and eccentricity lead him to accumulate a group of young followers in a mentor-like capacity. Narrated by Lewis Eliot, the novel has the more general background of Eliot's rising career and the changes in English society through the 20th century.

Reception
In a 1960 book review in Kirkus Reviews, the book was called a "slowly, closely pursued examination and rationale and an enlightened discussion of questions of conscience and conduct and commitment. And as such, if within a narrower margin, it is filled with the concerns which are so fundamentally and essentially a part of this writer's work and have attracted a firm following."

References

1940 British novels
English novels
British political novels
Novels by C. P. Snow
Macmillan Publishers books